

By nationality

 List of Argentines by net worth
 List of Americans by net worth
List of richest Americans in history
 List of Australians by net worth
Financial Review Rich List
 List of Austrians by net worth
 List of Belgians by net worth
 List of Brazilians by net worth
 List of British billionaires by net worth
 List of Canadians by net worth
 List of Chinese by net worth
 List of Cypriots by net worth
 List of Czechs by net worth
 List of Danes by net worth
 List of Dutch by net worth
 List of Egyptian billionaires
 List of Emiratis by net worth
 List of Finns by net worth
 List of French people by net worth
 List of Germans by net worth
 List of Greeks by net worth
 List of Hong Kong people by net worth
 List of Indian people by net worth
 List of Indonesians by net worth
 List of Irish people by net worth
 List of Israelis by net worth
 List of Italians by net worth
 List of Japanese by net worth
 List of Kazakhs by net worth
 List of Kenyans by net worth
 List of Kuwaitis by net worth
 List of Lebanese by net worth
 List of Malaysians by net worth
 List of Mexicans by net worth
 List of Monegasques by net worth
 List of New Zealanders by net worth
 List of Nigerian billionaires by net worth
 List of Norwegians by net worth
 List of Pakistanis by net worth
 List of Peruvians by net worth
 List of Poles by net worth
 List of Portuguese by net worth
 List of Russians by net worth
 List of Saudis by net worth
 List of Singaporeans by net worth
 List of Slovaks by net worth
 List of South Africans by net worth
 List of South Koreans by net worth
 List of Spaniards by net worth
 List of Swedes by net worth
 List of Swiss billionaires by net worth
 List of Taiwanese people by net worth
 List of Thais by net worth
 List of Turkish people by net worth
 List of Ugandans by net worth
 List of Ukrainians by net worth
 List of Venezuelans by net worth

By region
 List of Africans by net worth
 List of Arabs by net worth
 List of Europeans by net worth
 List of Latin Americans by net worth
 List of South Asian people by net worth
 List of Southeast Asian people by net worth

Miscellaneous
 Black billionaires
 LGBT billionaires
 List of countries by number of billionaires
 List of female billionaires
 List of royalty by net worth
 List of wealthiest historical figures
 List of wealthiest families

Forbes lists
 The World's Billionaires
 Forbes 400
 Forbes list of the world's highest-paid athletes

See also
 Overclass
 Ultra high-net-worth individual

Billionaires